The Mercury Program is an American musical group composed of Dave Lebleu on drums, Sander Travisano on bass guitar, Tom Reno on guitar, and Whit Travisano on vibraphone and piano.

History 
The first three members formed a trio in August 1997 and Whit Travisano joined in late 1999. Originally based in Gainesville, Florida, the band members live in different cities across the United States.

Mercury Program's first two albums feature sparse, spoken-word vocals. However, beginning with the release of the 2001 EP All the Suits Began to Fall Off, the band moved to an entirely instrumental format.

The band toured extensively in support of their critically acclaimed 2002 album A Data Learn the Language. Then, following the release of the split EP Confines of Heat in 2003, the Mercury Program went on extended hiatus, sporadically working on new material over the next several years. Since then, the band has reconvened occasionally to record, release and tour. Chez Viking was released November 24, 2009, and on May 20, 2016, the band released the EP New Myths, both on Lovitt Records.

In 2018, A Data Learn the Language was recut and reissued as a double LP on vinyl.

Discography
Albums
The Mercury Program (Tiger Style, 1999)
From The Vapor of Gasoline (Tiger Style, 2000)
A Data Learn the Language (Tiger Style, 2002)
Chez Viking (Lovitt Records, 2009)
EPs
All the Suits Began to Fall Off (Boxcar, 2001)
Confines of Heat (split release with Maserati + DVD, Kindercore, 2003)
New Myths (Lovitt Records, 2016)
Compilation Appearances
Back To Donut! (A No Idea Compilation) (No Idea, 1998)
Singles / 7 inches
The Mercury Program / Versailles 7" (split release with Versailles, Boxcar, 1998)
Lights Out In Georgia 7" (Boxcar, 1998)

References

External links
Official Webpage
 77 Boadrum Site Profile Viva Radio, Sep 2007. (Flash)

American post-rock groups
Indie rock musical groups from Florida
Musical groups from Gainesville, Florida
1997 establishments in Florida
Musical groups established in 1997